In computer science, parsing reveals the grammatical structure of linear input text, as a first step in working out its meaning.  Bottom-up parsing recognizes the text's lowest-level small details first, before its mid-level structures, and leaving the highest-level overall structure to last.

Bottom-up Versus Top-down

The bottom-up name comes from the concept of a parse tree, in which the most detailed parts are at the bottom of the upside-down tree, and larger structures composed from them are in successively higher layers, until at the top or "root" of the tree a single unit describes the entire input stream.  A bottom-up parse discovers and processes that tree starting from the bottom left end, and incrementally works its way upwards and rightwards. A parser may act on the structure hierarchy's low, mid, and highest levels without ever creating an actual data tree; the tree is then merely implicit in the parser's actions.  Bottom-up parsing patiently waits until it has scanned and parsed all parts of some construct before committing to what the combined construct is.

The opposite of this is top-down parsing, in which the input's overall structure is decided (or guessed at) first, before dealing with mid-level parts, leaving completion of all lowest-level details to last.  A top-down parser discovers and processes the hierarchical tree starting from the top, and incrementally works its way first downwards and then rightwards.  Top-down parsing eagerly decides what a construct is much earlier, when it has only scanned the leftmost symbol of that construct and has not yet parsed any of its parts.   Left corner parsing is a hybrid method that works bottom-up along the left edges of each subtree, and top-down on the rest of the parse tree.

If a language grammar has multiple rules that may start with the same leftmost symbols but have different endings, then that grammar can be efficiently handled by a deterministic bottom-up parse but cannot be handled top-down without guesswork and backtracking.  So bottom-up parsers in practice handle a somewhat larger range of computer language grammars than deterministic top-down parsers do.

Bottom-up parsing is sometimes done by backtracking. But much more commonly, bottom-up parsing is done by a shift-reduce parser such as a LALR parser.

Examples

Some of the parsers that use bottom-up parsing include:
 Precedence parser
 Simple precedence parser
 Operator-precedence parser
 Bounded-context parser (BC)
 LR parser (Left-to-right, Rightmost derivation in reverse)
 Simple LR parser (SLR)
 LALR parser (Look-Ahead)
 Canonical LR parser (LR(1))
 GLR parser (Generalized)
 CYK parser (Cocke–Younger–Kasami)
 Recursive ascent parser
 Packrat parser
 Shift-reduce parser

References

Parsing algorithms